This is a list of solar eclipses in the 19th century. During the period 1801 to 1900 there were 242 solar eclipses of which 87 were partial, 77 were annular, 63 were total, and 15 were hybrids. The greatest number of eclipses in one year was five, in 1805, and two months, January 1805 and December 1880, had two eclipses.

References

19th century-related lists
+19